The 1999–2000 UEFA Champions League first group stage matches took place between 14 September and 3 November 1999. The draw for the group stage was made in August 1999.

The group stage featured the 16 automatic qualifiers and the 16 winners of the third qualifying round. Each team was drawn into one of eight groups but avoided teams from their own country. All four teams in the group played home and away matches against each other to determine the winner and runner-up in the group.

At the completion of the group stage, the top two teams in each group advanced to play in a second group stage, while the third-placed teams dropped down to the UEFA Cup.

Seeding structure
Seeding was determined by the UEFA coefficients. Clubs from the same association were paired up to split the matchdays between Tuesday and Wednesday. Clubs with the same pairing letter would play on different days, ensuring that teams from the same city (e.g. Milan and Internazionale, who also share a stadium) did not play on the same day.

Tie-breaking criteria
Based on Article 7.06 in the UEFA regulations, if two or more teams are equal on points on completion of the group matches, the following criteria will be applied to determine the rankings:
higher number of points obtained in the group matches played among the teams in question;
superior goal difference from the group matches played among the teams in question;
higher number of goals scored away from home in the group matches played among the teams in question;
superior goal difference from all group matches played;
higher number of goals scored;
higher number of coefficient points accumulated by the club in question, as well as its association, over the previous five seasons.

Groups

Group A

Group B

Group C

Group D

Group E

Group F

Group G

Group H

References

External links
1999–2000 group stage matches at UEFA website

Group
UEFA Champions League group stages